Tanya Vidal-Dublin (born 1971) is an American actress, screenwriter, film director and producer of Puerto Rican descent.

Early years
 
Vidal is the daughter of Josie, a secretary, and Manny Vidal, a tax consultant and businessman. Her parents moved from Puerto Rico and settled in New York City, where Vidal and her two sisters Lisa and Christina were born. She also has a brother named Christian.

Acting career
From 2002 to 2003, Vidal worked on the series The Division as Lily. In 2005, she made her directoral debut with a short comedy film The Mosquito, which she also produced and wrote.

References

External links

American television actresses
Living people
American people of Puerto Rican descent
American women film directors
Actresses from New York City
Film directors from New York City
1971 births
People from Whitestone, Queens
Place of birth missing (living people)